The United States competed at the 2022 Winter Olympics in Beijing, China, from 4 to 20 February 2022.

On January 24, 2022, the United States Olympic & Paralympic Committee named a team of 224 athletes. Curler John Shuster and speed skater Brittany Bowe were named U.S. flagbearers for the opening ceremony. Bobsledder Elana Meyers Taylor was named flagbearer for the closing ceremony.

The United States won eight gold and 25 medals overall at the 2022 Winter Olympics, finishing fourth in the medal standings for the third Winter Olympics in a row. Notable successes included Jessie Diggins becoming the first American female skier to win individual cross-country medals, figure skater Nathan Chen breaking the short program world record en route to the Olympic gold medal in the men's singles, Erin Jackson becoming the first black female athlete to win speed skating gold, and Chloe Kim defending her title in the snowboarding women's halfpipe. Veteran snowboarder Lindsey Jacobellis, who last medaled at the 2006 Winter Olympics in Turin, was the only U.S. athlete with multiple gold medals, winning the women's snowboard cross event, and sharing the gold with teammate Nick Baumgartner in the mixed snowboard cross event.

Medalists

The following U.S. competitors won medals at the games. In the by discipline sections below, medalists' names are bolded.

 - Athletes that competed in preliminary/qualification rounds but not final round.

Competitors
The following is the list of number of competitors participating at the Games per sport.

Alpine skiing

The United States qualified a team of six men and 12 women.

The most decorated skier on the U.S. side was Mikaela Shiffrin, who was favored to win gold in several of the six events she was planning to compete in (especially slalom and giant slalom). However, she uncharacteristically crashed out of those races and then finished ninth in the super-G. In the remaining events, Shiffrin did not win a medal.

Nina O'Brien badly fractured her leg and was hospitalized. Top U.S. downhiller Breezy Johnson also qualified for the team, but had to withdraw due to a knee injury sustained in January.

Men

Women

Mixed

Biathlon

The United States qualified a team of four men and four women.

Men

Women

Mixed

Bobsleigh (bobsled)

The United States qualified two sleds each in all four events over the course of the 2021–22 Bobsleigh World Cup.

Men

Women

Cross-country skiing

The United States qualified six male and eight female cross-country skiers.

Distance
Men

Women

Sprint
Men

Qualification legend: Q - Qualify based on position in heat; q - Qualify based on time in field

Women

Qualification legend: Q - Qualify based on position in heat; q - Qualify based on time in field

Curling

Summary

Men's tournament

The United States qualified their men's team (five athletes), by finishing in the top six teams in the 2021 World Men's Curling Championship. Team John Shuster qualified as United States representatives by winning the 2021 United States Olympic Curling Trials, defeating Korey Dropkin 2–1 in the best-of-three final.

Round robin
The United States had a bye in draws 4, 8, and 11.

Draw 1
Wednesday, February 9, 20:05

Draw 2
Thursday, February 10, 14:05

Draw 3
Friday, February 11, 9:05

Draw 5
Saturday, February 12, 14:05

Draw 6
Sunday, February 13, 9:05

Draw 7
Sunday, February 13, 20:05

Draw 9
Tuesday, February 15, 9:05

Draw 10
Tuesday, February 16, 20:05

Draw 12
Thersday, February 17, 9:05

Semifinal
Thursday, February 17, 20:05

Bronze medal game
Friday, February 18, 14:05

Women's tournament

The United States qualified their women's team (five athletes), by finishing in the top six teams in the 2021 World Women's Curling Championship. Team Tabitha Peterson qualified as United States representatives by winning the 2021 United States Olympic Curling Trials, defeating Cory Christensen 2–0 in the best-of-three final.

Round robin
The United States had a bye in draws 4, 8, and 12.

Draw 1
Thursday, February 10, 9:05

Draw 2
Thursday, February 10, 20:05

Draw 3
Friday, February 11, 14:05

Draw 5
Saturday, February 12, 20:05

Draw 6
Sunday, February 13, 14:05

Draw 7
Monday, February 14, 9:05

Draw 9
Tuesday, February 15, 14:05

Draw 10
Wednesday, February 16, 9:05

Draw 11
Wednesday, February 16, 20:05

Mixed doubles tournament

The United States qualified their mixed doubles team (two athletes), by finishing in the top two teams in the 2021 Olympic Qualification Event. Vicky Persinger and Chris Plys qualified as the United States representatives by winning the 2021 United States Mixed Doubles Curling Olympic Trials, defeating Jamie Sinclair and Rich Ruohonen 7–6 in the final.

Round robin
The United States had a bye in draws 4, 5, 7, and 11.

Draw 1
Wednesday, February 2, 20:05

Draw 2
Thursday, February 3, 9:05

Draw 3
Thursday, February 3, 14:05

Draw 6
Friday, February 4, 13:35

Draw 8
Saturday, February 5, 14:05

Draw 9
Saturday, February 5, 20:05

Draw 10
Sunday, February 6, 9:05

Draw 12
Sunday, February 6, 20:05

Draw 13
Monday, February 7, 9:05

Figure skating

In the 2021 World Figure Skating Championships in Stockholm, Sweden, the United States secured two quotas in the men's, ladies', and pairs competitions, and three quotas in the ice dance competition. Third quotas for men's and ladies' were secured at the 2021 CS Nebelhorn Trophy.

Vincent Zhou withdrew from the men's singles event due to a positive COVID-19 test.

The U.S. won silver medals in the team event, which were not awarded at the Olympics due to pending investigation into a Russian doping scandal.

Individual

Mixed

Team

Freestyle skiing

The United States qualified a full team of 16 men and 16 women as well as a position in the mixed team aerials event.

Aerials
Men

Women

Mixed

Freeskiing
Men

Women

Moguls
Men

Women

Ski cross

Ice hockey

The United States qualified 25 male and 23 female competitors to the ice hockey tournaments as part of the country's two teams.

Summary

Men's tournament

The United States men's national ice hockey team qualified by being ranked 6th in the 2019 IIHF World Rankings.

Team roster

Group play

Quarterfinals

Women's tournament

The United States women's national ice hockey team qualified by being ranked 1st in the 2020 IIHF World Rankings.

Team roster

Group play

Quarterfinals

Semifinals

Gold medal game

Luge 

The United States qualified three men's and three women's entries as well as a men's doubles entry over the course of the 2021–22 Luge World Cup. Qualifying at least one sled in each discipline also qualified the United States for the team relay.

Men

Women

Mixed/Open

Nordic combined

The United States qualified a team of five Nordic combined athletes.

Short track speed skating

The United States qualified a team of two men and five women based on performance in the 2021–22 ISU Short Track Speed Skating World Cup. Additionally, the United States qualified in the women's and mixed relays.

Men

Qualification legend: Q - Qualify based on position in heat; q - Qualify based on time in field; FA - Qualify to medal final; FB - Qualify to consolation final

Women

Qualification legend: Q - Qualify based on position in heat; q - Qualify based on time in field; ADV - Advanced to next round on referee decision; FA - Qualify to medal final; FB - Qualify to consolation final; ADV A - Advanced to medal final on referee decision; ADV B - Advanced to consolation final on referee decision

Mixed

Qualification legend: Q - Qualify based on position in heat; q - Qualify based on time in field; FA - Qualify to medal final; FB - Qualify to consolation final

Skeleton

The United States qualified one male and two female skeleton racers over the course of the 2021–22 Skeleton World Cup.

Ski jumping

The United States qualified a team of four men and one woman in ski jumping.

Men

Women

Snowboarding

The United States confirmed quota spots for 13 men and 12 women snowboarders.

Freestyle
Men

Women

Parallel

Snowboard cross
Men

Women

Mixed

Qualification legend: Q - Qualify to next round; FA - Qualify to medal final; FB - Qualify to consolation final

Speed skating

The United States qualified seven men, including a team in the Team pursuit event, and five women over the course of the 2021–22 ISU Speed Skating World Cup.

Casey Dawson was replaced by Emery Lehman in the 5000 meters due to a positive test for COVID-19.

Erin Jackson became the first Black female athlete to win a medal in speed skating after her gold medal performance in the 500 meters.

Distance
Men

Women

Mass start

Team pursuit

Qualification legend: Q - Qualify to the next round; FA - Qualify to the gold medal final; FB - Qualify to the bronze medal final; FC - Qualify to the 5th place final; FD - Qualify to the 7th place final

Calls for Olympic boycott

On 22 February 2021, U.S. Representative John Katko from New York called for a United States boycott of the 2022 Olympic Games, citing human rights concerns and the Chinese Communist Party's actions against the country's own Uyghur population, including displacement and imprisonment of civilians in the Xinjiang internment camps. Representative Katko published an open letter recommending a boycott to the House Committee on Homeland Security, as well as President Biden, National Security Advisor Jake Sullivan, U.S. Secretary of State Antony Blinken, Secretary of Homeland Security Alejandro Mayorkas, and the International Olympic Committee. In the open letter, Katko cited an earlier 19 January 2021 statement from then-serving U.S. Secretary of State Mike Pompeo, in which Pompeo stated that, "since at least March 2017, the People's Republic of China (PRC), under the direction and control of the Chinese Communist Party (CCP), has committed crimes against humanity against the predominantly Muslim Uyghurs and other members of ethnic and religious minority groups in Xinjiang."

Former United States Ambassador to the United Nations, Republican Nikki Haley, announced her support of a possible boycott, authoring a 25 February 2021 op-ed for Fox News titled "Amb. Nikki Haley: Biden should boycott China's Winter Olympics next year", comparing the government and ideology of Nazi Germany to that of "Communist China", urging President Biden to boycott the Olympics in collaboration with American-allied nations. Haley further compared the future 2022 Beijing Games to the 1936 Berlin Olympics, the last Olympics to be held before the outbreak of World War II.

In an unrelated interview on 5 March 2021, former Secretary Pompeo stated that the United States should withdraw from the 2022 Olympic Games. In an interview with conservative talk radio host Hugh Hewitt, Pompeo cited "nasty activity" by the Chinese government as evidence to support a boycott.

In a Politico article published on 10 March 2021, Texas Senator Ted Cruz spoke against a possible boycott, stating, "I don't think we should be punishing athletes who have spent their entire lives training. We should go to Beijing, compete, and win." Florida Senator Marco Rubio previously signed a resolution authored by Senator Rick Scott which "demanded the International Olympic Committee move the 2022 Winter Olympics out of Communist China", but also refused to support a boycott, stating that he did not make a formal decision yet. Democratic Senator Ben Cardin, a ranking member of the Senate Foreign Relations Committee, stated that "It's important that we use every opportunity to advance global support against what China is doing", recognizing that "[boycotting the 2022 Olympics] may be not a realistic path forward, but it's certainly something we should be talking about."

On 15 March 2021, the New York Times published an op-ed by U.S. Senator and former 2012 Republican presidential candidate, Mitt Romney, titled "The Right Way to Boycott the Beijing Olympics." In the piece, Romney stated that the United States should pursue a partial "economic and diplomatic boycott" of the Olympics, with athletes participating in the games but "limiting spectators, selectively shaping our respective delegations and refraining from broadcasting Chinese propaganda." Romney ended the piece criticizing the International Olympic Committee for their selection of host countries, commenting that "In authoritarian states, the Olympics has more often been a tool of propaganda than a lever of reform."

On 19 October 2021, American figure skater Evan Bates described the situation in Xinjiang as "terrible" and "awful", and Vincent Zhou and Nathan Chen, skaters of Chinese descent, echoed Bates' statement over the human rights situation in Xinjiang.

On 6 December 2021, President Biden announced that the United States would diplomatically boycott the Olympic Games. Unlike a complete boycott, it did not have any impact for any athletes from the United States attending the Winter Games.

A boycott of the 2022 Olympic Games would have been the second American-led boycott of the modern Olympic Games. The United States and 65 other nations boycotted the 1980 Summer Olympics, which were primarily held in Moscow, Russian SFSR, Soviet Union, in present-day Russia. The bloc cited the Soviet Invasion of Afghanistan as their rationale for the boycott, with the United States hosting a substitute track and field event called the Liberty Bell Classic, with China in attendance. Four years later, the Soviet Union and 14 of its allies then boycotted the 1984 Summer Olympics, which were held in Los Angeles, United States. The Soviet-allied countries then substituted the 1984 Olympics by organizing the Friendship Games (which was attended by China). The Friendship Games were held in a variety of venues, including the Soviet Union, Bulgaria, Czechoslovakia (now the Czech Republic and Slovakia), Cuba, Hungary, Mongolia, Poland, and East Germany (now part of Germany). Despite participating in the Friendship Games, China also participated at the 1984 Summer Olympics in Los Angeles, participating for the first time since 1952 and having boycotted the 1980 Summer Games in Moscow due to the Sino-Soviet split.

Athlete safety
Competitors were warned by Human Rights Watch that speaking out was not tolerated in China and as a result if they spoke out about human rights or other issues in China they faced significant legal penalties. For their protection the American team was shielded from questions related to human rights.

Members of Congress expressed their concerns about athlete safety.  Retired Olympic cross-country skier Noah Hoffman also expressed concerns about athlete safety, citing China's human rights record and a lack of concern shown by the IOC.

See also
United States at the 2022 Winter Paralympics

Notes

References

External links

Nations at the 2022 Winter Olympics
2022
Winter Olympics